The Kasson Public Library serves the residents of Kasson, Mantorville and surrounding areas in the U.S. state of Minnesota with a service area of approximately 12,000 people. The library is a member of the SELCO regional library system.

In 2016, the library moved to a new  building at 607 First St. NW, Kasson.

References

External links
Google Map to Library
City page for Library

Public libraries in Minnesota
Education in Dodge County, Minnesota
Buildings and structures in Dodge County, Minnesota